This is a list of American magazines that are no longer published.

0–9 

 02138 (2006–2008)
 1984 (1978–1983)
 3-2-1 Contact, Sesame Workshop (1979–2001)
 '47 (1947–1948)
 7ball (1995–2004)
 80 Micro (1980–1988)

A 

 A. Magazine (1989–2002)
 A. Merritt's Fantasy Magazine (1949–1950)
 Aboriginal Science Fiction (1986–2001)
 Absolute Magnitude (1993–2006)
 Access: America's Guide to the Internet, Access Media Inc. (1998–2001)
 Addicted to Noise, Addicted to Noise (1996–2000)
 Adult Journeys, Judson Press ( –2001)
 Adventist Currents (1983–1988)
 Adventure (1910–1971)
 After Dark (1968–1982)
 Agency, American Association of Advertising Agencies ( –2001)
 Agricultural Museum (1810–1812)
 Ainslee's Magazine (1897–1926)
 Air Progress, Challenge Publications (1938–1997)
 Air Wonder Stories (1929–1955)
 The Aldine (1868–1879)
 AlleyCat News, AlleyCat Information Sciences (1997–2001)
 Alt Variety, Lee Wong. (2012–13)
 The Alternate Source Programmer's Journal (1980–1983)
 Alternative Medicine Advisor, Rebus Inc. (1999–2000)
 The Amateur Astronomer (1929–1935)
 Amazing Computing (1985–1999)
 Amazing Heroes, Fantagraphics Books (1981–1992)
 Amazing Stories (1926–2005)
 The American Boy (1899–1941)
 American Health, Reader's Digest Association, (1981–1999) (folded into Health)
 American Heritage (1947–2012)
 The American Home (1928–1977)
 The American Jewess (1895–1899)
 The American Magazine (1904–1956)
 American Magazine of Useful and Entertaining Knowledge (1834–1837)
 The American Mercury (1924–1981)
 The American Museum (1787–1792)
 American Review (1967–1977)
 The American Review (1933–1937)
 The American Review: A Whig Journal (1845–1849)
 The American Weekly (1896–1966)
 Amerika (1944–1994)
 Amiga World (1985–1995)
 Analectic Magazine (1813–1820)
 ANALOG Computing (1981–1989)
 Anime Insider (2001–2009)
 ANSWER Me! (1991–1994)
 Antaeus (1970–1994)
 Antic (1982–1990)
 Anything That Moves (1990–2002)
 Aperitif Magazine
 Appleton's Magazine (1869–1909)
 Aqua, Islands Publishing Co. (1998–2000)
 Ares (1980–1984)
 Argosy (1882–1978)
 The Arkham Collector (1967–1971)
 The Arkham Sampler (1948–1949)
 Army Man (1988–1990)
 Art Amateur (1879–1903)
 ArtByte, Fanning Publishing Co. Inc. (1998–2001)
 Arthur's Lady's Home Magazine (1852–1898)
 Arthur's Magazine (1844–1846)
 Arts & Architecture (1929–1967)
 Asia (1898–1947)
 Asiaweek, Time Inc. (1975–2001)
 Asimov's SF Adventure Magazine (1978–1979)
 Astonishing Stories (1940–1943)
 Atari Age (1982–1984)
 Atari Connection (1981–1984)
 Automotive News International, Crain Communications (1993–2001)
 Automobile (1996–2020)
 Autoweek (1958–2019)
 Avon Fantasy Reader (1947–1952)

B 

 B. Smith Style, American Express Publishing Corp. (1999–2000)
 Ballyhoo (1931–1939)
 Baltimore Saturday Visiter
 Bananas, Scholastic (1975–1984)
 Barney Magazine (1994–2003)
 Barney Magazine Family (1994–1999)
 Baseball Hobby News (1979–1993)
 Baseball Magazine (1908–1957)
 Battleplan (1987–1989)
 BattleTechnology (1987–1995)
 BB, PRIMEDIA Consumer Magazine Group (1987–2000)
 BBW, Various including Larry Flynt Publications Inc. (1979–2003)
 Between C & D (1983–1990)
 Beyond Fantasy Fiction (1953–1955)
 Big Brother (1992–2004)
 Bill Apters W O W Xtra Magazine, H&S Media Inc. (2000–2001)
 The Black Cat (1895–1922)
 Black Issues Book Review (1999–2007)
 Black Mask (1920–1951)
 The Blast (1916–1917)
 Blazing Combat (1965–1966)
 Blip (1983)
 BLK (1988–1994)
 Blue (1997–2000)
 Blue Book (1905–1975)
 The Boardgamer (1995–2004)
 Boardwatch (1987–2002)
 Body+Soul (2002–2010)
 Boing Boing (1988–1996)
 Boise Magazine, Boise Magazine LLC (1997–2001)
 Bold, Davis Media Group (2000–2001)
 Bomb Rack (1945–1946)
 The Bookman (1895–1933)
 Borzoi International, Borzoi International Inc. (1988–2001)
 Boston Business Forward, Business Forward Media Inc. ( –2001)
 Boston Magazine (1783–1786)
 The Boston Miscellany (1842–1843)
 Boston Monthly Magazine (1825–1826)
 Boston Weekly Magazine (1802–1808)
 Bower of Taste (1828–1830)
 Bradley His Book (1896–1897)
 Brainstorm NW (1997–2009)
 Brill's Content Magazine, Steven Brill (1998–2001)
 Broadway Journal (1844–1846)
 Broom: An International Magazine of the Arts (1921–1924)
 Burr McIntosh Monthly (1903–1910)
 Burton's Gentleman's Magazine (1837–1841)
 Business 2.0, Time Inc. (1995–2001) (folded into eCompany Now)
 Business Nashville ( –2001)
 Bust, Razorfish Studios (1993–2001)
 Byte, UBM plc (1975–1998)

C 

 C/C++ Users Journal (1981–2006)
 C++ Report (1989–2002)
 Calico Print ( –1953)
 California (1976–1991)
 California Pelican (1903–1988)
 The Californian (1880–1882)
 Captain Future (1940–1944)
 Careers and the Engineer, Crimson & Brown Associates ( –2000)
 Caribbean Travel & Life (1986–2013)
 Cartoons Magazine (1912–1922)
 Castle of Frankenstein (1962–1975)
 Cats Magazine, PRIMEDIA Special Interest Group (1945–2001)
 CD-ROM Today (1993–1996)
 The Century Magazine (1881–1930)
 The Chap-Book (1894–1898)
 Charley Jones' Laugh Book Magazine (1943–ca.1965)
 The Chicagoan (1926–1935)
 Child (1986–2007)
 Children's Digest (1950–2009)
 The Children's Friend (1902–1970)
 Cinefantastique (1967–2006)
 Civilization, U.S. Library of Congress (1994–2000)
 Clamor (1999–2006)
 Classic American Home, Hearst Corp. (1975–2001)
 Classic Style Magazine (2006–2008)
 The Class Struggle (1917–1919)
 CLUTCH (1991–1998)
 Code, Larry Flynt Publications Inc. (1999–2001)
 CoEvolution Quarterly (1974–1984)
 College Humor (1920–ca.1945)
 The Colophon, A Book Collectors' Quarterly (1929–1950)
 Columbiad, PRIMEDIA Enthusiast Publications ( –2000)
 Columbian Magazine (1786–1792)
 Comet (1940–1941)
 The Comet (1930–1933)
 The Comics Journal, Fantagraphics Books (1977–2009)
 Comics Scene, Starlog Group (1982–2000)
 Common Lives/Lesbian Lives (1980–1996)
 Compute! (1979–1994)
 COMPUTE!'s Gazette (1983–1995)
 Computer Currents (1993–?)
 Computer Game Review ( –1996)
 Computer Games Magazine (2000–2007)
 Computer Gaming World (1981–2006)
 Computer Language (1984–1993)
 Computer Shopper (1979–2009)
 ComputorEdge Magazine (1983–2007)
 Condé Nast Portfolio (2007–2009)
 Confessions Illustrated (1956)
 Confidential (1952–1978)
 Connections, Atlantic Southeast Airlines ( –2001)
 Consumers Digest (1959–2019)
 Contact Kids, Sesame Workshop (1979–2001)
 Contempo: A Review of Books and Personalities (1931–1934)
 The Contributor (1879–1896)
 Coronet (1936–1971)
 Cosmic Stories (1941)
 Cosmogirl (1999–2009)
 Country Gentleman (1831–1955)
 Country Journal, PRIMEDIA Consumer Magazines & Internet Group (1974–2001)
 Country Life in America (1901–1942)
 Country, The Magazine of the Hamptons, M. Shanken Communications Inc. (1998–2001)
 Country Song Roundup, Country Song Roundup Inc. (1949–2001)
 The Courier (1968–2005)
 Cracked (1958–2007)
 Crazy Magazine (1973–1983)
 Creative Computing (1974–1985)
 Creepy (1964–1983)
 The Cricket ( –ca.1895)
 Crime Illustrated (1955–1956)
 Curio, Curio Magazine Inc. (1996–2000)
 Current Literature (1888–1913)
 Cursor (1978–1982)
 Cycle News (1965–2010)

D 

 Dads, Dads Media LLC (2000)
 Daily Mumble
 Dance Music Report (1978–1992)
 Datamation (1957–1998)
 Datebook (ca.1965–ca.1969)
 DDT (ca.1988–2005)
 De Bow's Review (1846–1884)
 The Delineator (1869–1937)
 Dell Pencil Puzzles & Word Games, Dell Magazines ( –2000)
 Desert Magazine (1937–1985)
 Desert Rat Scrap Book (1945–1967)
 Desktop Publishing Magazine (1985–1986)
 Details (1982–2015)
 Detective Book Magazine (1930–1931; 1937–1952)
 develop (1990–1997)
 The Dial (1840–1929)
 digitalFOTO, Imagine Media Inc. (2000–2001)
 DigitalSouth, Dbusiness.com (2001)
 The Dinosaur Times (ca. 1992–ca.1993)
 Disney Adventures (1990–2007)
 The Disney Channel Magazine' (1983–1998)
 Disney Magazine (1965–2005)
 Disneyland (Magazine) (1970)
 DMA (1993–2003)
 Doctor Death (1935)
 Dollar Sense, Baumer Financial Publishing (1977–2001)
 Dr. Dobb's Journal (1976–2009)
 Dr. Yen Sin (1936)
 Drag Racing USA, McMullen Argus Publishing (1989–2001)
 Dragon (magazine), TSR / WotC / Paizo (1975–2007)
 Dragonsmoke (ca.1974–ca. 1979)
 The Dude (1956–ca.1976)
 Dynamic Science Fiction (1952–1954)
 Dynamic Science Stories (1939)
 Dynamite, Scholastic (1974–1992)

E 

 eBay Magazine, Krause Publications Inc. (1999–2000)
 eCommerce Business, Cahners Business Information ( –2001)
 Eerie (1966–1983)
 EGM² (1994–1998)
 The Electric Company Magazine, Scholastic (1972–1987)
 Electrical Experimenter (1913–1920)
 Electronic Cottage (1989–1991)
 Electronic Games (1981–1985)
 Electronics (1930–1995)
 Electronics Illustrated, Fawcett Publications (1958–1972)
 Elle Girl (2001–2006)
 Emerge (1989–2000)
 Emigre (1984–2005)
 Enter, Sesame Workshop (1983–1985)
 Escape, Escape Magazine Inc. (1994–2000)
 ESPN The Magazine (1998–2019)
 Eternity (1950–1988)
 Eternity SF (1972–1980)
 The Etude (1883–1957)
 eV, Cahners Business Information (2000–2001)
 Evangelica (1980–1987)
 Every Saturday (1866–1874)
 Everybody's Magazine (1899–1929)
 Expedia Travels, Ziff-Davis Media (2000–2001)
 Expert Gamer (1998–2001)
 Eye, Hearst Corporation (1968–1969)
 Eye (Greensboro), Eye Inc. (1992–2000)

F 

 Fact (1964–1967)
 Factsheet Five (1982–1998)
 Fame and Fortune Weekly (1909–1928)
 Family Circle Christmas Helps & Holiday Baking, Family Circle Inc. (1954–2001)
 Family Computing (1983–1988)
 Family Life, Time Inc. (1993–2001)
 Family Money, Meredith Corp. (1997–2001)
 FamilyPC (1994–2001)
 Famous Fantastic Mysteries (1939–1953)
 Famous Monsters of Filmland (1958–1983)
 Fantastic (1952–1980)
 Fantastic Adventures (1939–1953)
 Fantastic Films (1978–1985)
 Fantastic Novels (1940–1941; 1948–1951)
 Fantastic Story Magazine (1950–1955)
 Fantastic Universe (1953–1960)
 Fantasy Fiction (1953)
 Farm & Fireside (1878–1939)
 Fast Folk (1982–1997)
 The Feet (1970–1973)
 Field and Stream (1895–2015; continues online)
 Film Culture (1955–1996)
 Fire!! (1926)
 Florida Magazine (1900–1903)
 Florida Travel+Life (?–2013)
 Flying Aces (1928–1945)
 FOOM (1973–1978)
 Forced Exposure (1980–1993)
 Forerunner (1909–1916)
 Forgotten Fantasy (1970–1971)
 The Formalist (1990–2004)
 The Forum (1885–1950)
 Frank Leslie's Illustrated Newspaper (1852–1922)
 Frank Leslie's Popular Monthly (1876–1904)
 Freedomways (1961–1985)
 FringeWare Review (1992–1998)
 Fuse (2000)
 Fuck You (1962–1965)
 Future Life (1978–1981)
 Future Science Fiction (1939–1943; 1950–1960)
 Future Sex (1993–?)

G 

 The Galaxy (1869–ca.1879)
 Galaxy Science Fiction (1950–1980)
 Galileo (1976–1980)
 Game Players ( –1998)
 GameGO! (2001)
 GameNOW (2001–2004)
 GamePro (1989–2011)
 Games for Windows: The Official Magazine (2006–2008)
 Games Unplugged (2000–2004)
 GameWeek Magazine (1995–2002)
 GAO Journal (1988–1992)
 GAO Review (1966–1987)
 Gavin Report (1958–2002)
 Gay Chicago (1976–2011)
 The General (1964–1998)
 George, Hachette Filipacchi Magazines Inc. (1995–2001)
 Girl Germs (1990–?)
 Glass Collector's Digest, Glass Press Inc. (1987–2001)
 The Glass Eye (1994–2006)
 Gleason's Pictorial Drawing-Room Companion (1851–1859)
 The Glebe (1913–1914)
 Glue, Glue (1997–2001)
 GMR (2003–2005)
 Gnosis (1985–1999)
 Godey's Lady's Book (1830–1898)
 Golden Hours (1889–1901)
 GOSH! (1978–1979)
 Gourmet (1941–2009)
 Grace, Grace Media (2002–2003)
 Graham's Magazine (1840–1858)
 Grand Street (1981–2004)
 Gray Areas (1992–1995)
 Great American Crafts, Krause Publications Inc. (1998–2001)
 Great Chefs, H&S Media Inc. ( –2001)
 Great Grilling, H&S Media Inc. ( –2001)
 Greed Magazine (1986–1989)
 Green, ilife.com (1995–2000)
 The Green Guide, Mothers & Others for a Livable Planet Inc. (1994–2001)
 The Grenadier (1978–1990)
 Groom & Board, H.H. Backer Associates Inc. (1980–2001)
 Growing Without Schooling (1977–2001)
 Guideposts for Kids, Guideposts Associates Inc. ( –2001)
 Guitar for the Practicing Musician (1982–1999)
 Guitar Shop, Cherry Lane Magazines Inc. (1994–2000)
 Gulfscapes Magazine (2001–2012)
 Gunton's Magazine (1891–1904)

H 

 Hands-On Electronics (1984–1989)
 The Hard Copy Observer (1991–2012)
 Harp (2001–2008)
 Harper's Weekly (1857–1916)
 Harper's Young People (1879–1899)
 Harvest (1980–1992)
 HDI, CMP Media (1998–2001)
 Healthy Kids, American Baby/American Academy of Pediatrics/PRIMEDIA (1989–2001)
 Helix SF ( –2008)
 Help! (1960–1965)
 Hewlett-Packard Journal, HP (1949–1998)
 Hi (2003–2005)
 High Performance Mopar, PRIMEDIA ( –2001)
 Holiday (1946–1977)
 Holland's Magazine (1876–1953)
 Hollywood Detective (1942–1950)
 Hollywood Star (1976–1981)
 Home Monthly (1896–1900)
 Homes & Ideas, IPC Media (1993–2001)
 Hooey (ca.1931–ca.1935)
 Horizon (1958–1989)
 Horror Stories (1935–1941)
 Hot, H&S Media Inc. (2000–2001)
 Hot Dog!, Scholastic (1979–199?)
 HotDots, Time Inc. (2000–2001)
 Hound & Horn (1927–1934)
 Houston City Magazine (1977–1987)
 huH (1994–?)
 Humbug (1957–1958)

I 

 If (1952–1974)
 Illustrated Police News (ca.1860–1904)
 Imagination (1950–1958)
 Imaginative Tales (1954–1958)
 Impact Press (1996–2006)
 Improvement Era (1897–1970)
 inCider (1983–1989)
 The Independent (1848–1928)
 Individual Investor, Individual Investor Group (1981–2001)
 The Industry Standard, Standard Media International (1998–2001)
 Infinity (1955–1958)
 .info (1983–1992)
 Injection Molding Magazine (1993–2011)
 Innerloop Magazine (2002–2004)
 InQuest Gamer (1995–2007)
 Inquiry Magazine (1977–1984)
 Insect Trust Gazette (1964–1968)
 Inside Kung Fu (1973–2011)
 Inside Sports (1979–1998)
 The Instructor (1930–1970)
 Intelligent Enterprise (1998–ca.2007)
 Interactive Week, Ziff-Davis Media (1994–2001)
 Interface Age (1976–1985)
 International Language Review (1955–1968)

J 

 Jane, Advance Publications (1997–2007)
 Java Report, Sigs Publications Inc. (1996–2001)
 Jem (1956–?)
 John Martin's Book (1912–1933)
 Joystik (1982–1983)
 Judge (1881–1947)
 Jump, Weider Publications (1997–2001) (folded into G+Js YM)
 Juvenile Instructor (1866–1929)

K 

 Kanto Plainsman (1961–1970)
 Ken (1938–ca.1939)
 Kid City, Sesame Workshop (1974–2001)
 Kilobaud Microcomputing (1977–1984)
 Kit Car Illustrated ( –ca.2001)
 Kitchen Gardener, Taunton Press ( –2001)
 The Knickerbocker (1833–1965)

L 

 L=A=N=G=U=A=G=E (1978–1981)
 La Llumanera de Nova York (1874–1881)
 The Ladder (1956–1970)
 Ladies' Home Journal of Philadelphia
 Ladies' Magazine ( –1836)
 LAN Times (1988–1997)
 Land and Liberty (ca.1914–ca.1915)
 Latin Girl, Latin Girl Magazine (1999–2001)
 Left and Right: A Journal of Libertarian Thought (1965–1968)
 Legion of Doom Technical Journals (ca.1980–ca.2000)
 The Liberator (1918–1924)
 The Libertarian Forum (1969–1984)
 Libertarian Review (1972–1981)
 Liberty (1881–1908)
 Liberty (1924–1950)
 Library (1900)
 Life Magazine (1883–2000)
 Lingua Franca, Academic Partners LLC (1990–2001)
 LiP magazine (1996–2007)
 The Literary Digest (1890–1938)
 The Little Pilgrim (1853–1868)
 The Little Review (1914–1929)
 Living Greyhawk Journal (2000–2004)
 Loadstar (1984–2010)
 Locus Solus (1961–1962)
 Look (1937–1971)
 Lowrider (1976–2019)

M

 M.D. (1955–1956)
 Mademoiselle, Conde Nast (1935–2001)
 The Magazine of American History (1877–1917)
 The Mahogany Tree (1892)
 Manhattan File, Kirchhoff Communications LLC (1994–2001)
 Marie Claire Health & Beauty, IPC Media (1994–2001)
 Marion Zimmer Bradley's Fantasy Magazine (1988–2000)
 Martha Stewart Living (1990–2022)
 Marvel Science Stories (1938–1941; 1950–1952)
 Marvel Tales (1934–1935; 1938–1941; 1950–1952)
 Marvelmania Magazine (1969–1971)
 Mary Beth's Bean Bag World (1997–2001)
 Mary Beth's Teddy Bears & More, H&S Media Inc. (2000–2001)
 Mary-Kate and Ashley Magazine, H&S Media Inc. ( –2001)
 Massachusetts Magazine (1789–1796)
 The Masses (1911–1917)
 The Master Skier (ca.1987–2010)
 Mature Outlook, Merdith Corp./Sears Roebuck Corp. (1983–2001)
 Maximum Golf, News Corp.'s News America Magazines Inc. (2000–2001)
 Maximum Linux, Imagine Media Inc. (2000–2001)
 McCall's (1873–2002)
 McClure's (1893–1929)
 Mechanix Illustrated (1928–2001)
 Men's Vogue (2005–2008)
 Mental Floss (2001–2016)
 Merry's Museum (1841–ca.1872)
 The Messenger (1917–1928)
 Metal Edge (1985–2009)
 Metropolitan Home (1974–2009)
 Metropolitan Magazine (1895–1925)
 MH-18, Rodale (2000–2001)
 Michigan Hunting & Fishing, PRIMEDIA ( –2001)
 Micro Cornucopia (1981–1990)
 Microsystems (1980–1984)
 MicroTimes, PRIMEDIA Haas Publishing Co. ( –2001)
 The Midland (1915–1933)
 Midnight Engineering (1989–2001)
 Might ( –1997)
 Mini Truckin' (1988–2014)
 Mirabella (1989–2000)
 Miracle Science and Fantasy Stories (1931)
 MMO Games Magazine (2006–2007)
 Mobile PC (2004–2005)
 Mode, Lewit & LeWinter Inc. (1997–2001)
 Model Rocketry (1968–1972)
 Modern Electrics (1908–1913)
 Modern Electronics (1984–1991)
 Modern Man (1952–ca.1969)
 Modern Nomad (2001–2004)
 Modern Screen (1930–1985)
 Mondo 2000 (1984–1998)
 Money (1972–2019)
 The Monster Times (1972–1976)
 Monthly Anthology (1804–1811)
 Moody Street Irregulars (1978–1992)
 Mopar Action, Harris (1988–2016), AMG Parade (2016)
 Motion Picture Herald (1931–1972)
 Motion Picture News (1913–1930)
 Moves (1972–1981; 1991–2002)
 The Moving Picture World (1907–1927)
 Munsey's Magazine (1889–1929)
 Musician (1976–1999)
 Mustang Illustrated, PRIMEDIA ( –2001)
 The Mysterious Traveler (1951–1952)

N 

 NASCAR Illustrated (1982–2016)
 NASCAR Scene (1978–2010)
 National Farm Boy Magazine (1921–?)
 National Lampoon (1970–1998)
 The Nautilus (1898–1953)
 Nemo ( –ca.1989)
 Nest: A Quarterly of Interiors (1997–2004)
 New Age Journal (1974–2002)
 New American Review (1967–1977)
 The New Electric Railway Journal (1988–1999)
 The New England Magazine (1884–1917)
 The New-England Magazine (1821–1835)
 New England Monthly (1984–1990)
 The New Era Illustrated Magazine (1902–1935/6)
 The New Leader (1924–2006)
 New World Writing (1951–1964)
 New York Dog (2004)
 The New-York Magazine (1790–1797)
 New York Sportsman, PRIMEDIA (1972–2001)
 Next Generation (1995–2002)
 Nextstep (magazine) (1995–2008(?))
 Niagara Frontier Review (1964–1966)
 Nibble (1980–1992)
 Nickelodeon Magazine (1990–2009)
 Nick Jr. Family Magazine (1999–2008)
 Nick Jr. Noodle (1999–2007)
 Night Sky (2004–2007)
 Nintendo Power (1988–2012)
 Noggin (1990–1993)
 Now Playing (2005–2006)
 Nuestro (1977–ca.1980)
 NutriMag (1999–2001)

O 

 o-blek (1987–1993)
 Oceans of the Mind (2001–2006)
 Official Dreamcast Magazine (1999–2001)
 Official SEGA Dreamcast Magazine, Imagine Media Inc. (1999–2001)
 Official Web Guide, PRIMEDIA Haas Publishing Co. ( –2001)
 Offspring, Hearst Corp. (2000–2001)
 Ole' (1964–?)
 Omni (1978–1998)
 On, Time Inc. (1996–2001)
 One, One Media (2001)
 OP Magazine (1979–1984)
 Operations Magazine (1991–2010)
 Option (1985–1998)
 Orbit Science Fiction (1953–1954)
 Origin (1951–ca.2004)
 Other Worlds (1949–1958)
 Others: A Magazine of the New Verse (1915–1919)
 Oui (1964–2007)
 Out of This World Adventures (1950)
 Outdoor Explorer, Time4 Media Inc. (1999–2001)
 The Outlook (1870–1935)
 Overland Monthly (1868–1935)
 OverRev (2004–2006)
 Oz-story Magazine (1995–2000)

P 

 Pacific Magazine (1976–2008)
 The Pacific Monthly (1898–1911)
 Pacific RailNews (1961–1999)
 Pageant (1944–1977)
 Panzerfaust Magazine (1967–1976)
 Paradox (2003–2009)
 Partisan Review (1934–2003)
 PC Direct, VNU Business Publications ( –2001)
 PC Life (1986–1988)
 PC Magazine (1982–2009)
 PC/Computing ( –2002)
 Peanut Butter, Scholastic (19??–19??)
 Pennsylvania Sportsman, PRIMEDIA (1959–2001)
 People Today (1950–?)
 Petersen's 4-Wheel & Off-Road (1977–2019)
 Peterson's Magazine (1842–1898)
 Photoplay (1911–1980)
 PiQ (2008)
 Pizzazz, Marvel Comics (1977–1979)
 Planet Stories (1939–1955)
 Playboy (1953–2020)
 Playgirl (1973–2016)
 The Pleasure Boat (1845–1862)
 Pocket Magazine (1895–?)
 Pojos Pokémon, H&S Media Inc. (1999–2001)
 politics (1944–1949)
 Polyanthos (1805–1814)
 Popular Electronics (1954–1999)
 The Popular Magazine (1903–1931)
 Portfolio: An Intercontinental Quarterly (1945–1947)
 Portfolio Magazine (1979–1983)
 The Portico (1816–1818)
 Practical Anarchy (1991–2007)
 Premiere (1987–2007)
 The Print Collector's Quarterly (1911–1950)
 Pro Football Weekly (1967–2013)
 Preschool Playroom Magazine (2002–2006)
 Psychoanalysis (1955)
 Psychotronic Video (1989–2006)
 Putnam's Magazine (1853–1910)

Q 

 Quark (1970–?)
 The Quarterly (1987–1995)
 Quick & Easy Crafts, H&S Media Inc. ( –2001)

R 

 Radiance, Radiance (1984–2001)
 Radical America (1967–1999)
 Radical Society (2002–ca.2006)
 Radio-Electronics (1929–2003)
 Railroad Man's Magazine (1906–1979)
 The Rainbow (1981–1993)
 Ramparts (1962–1975)
 Ray Gun (1992–2000)
 The Reaper (1980–1989)
 Red Herring (1993–2007)
 Reedy's Mirror (1891–1994)
 Relief Society Magazine (1915–1970)
 The Reporter (1949–1968)
 Review of Reviews (1892–1937)
 Revolution (Brisbane), Imagine Media (2000–2001)
 The Rip Off Review of Western Culture (1972)
 Road to Freedom (1927–1931)
 Royal American Magazine (1774–1775)
 RUN (1984–1992)

S 

 St. Nicholas Magazine (1873–1943)
 Samizdat (1998–2004)
 San Francisco Review of Books (1975–1997)
 Sassy (1988–1996)
 Satellite Science Fiction (1956–1959)
 Saturday Review (1920–1984)
 Saturn (1957–1958)
 Scanlan's Monthly (1970–1971)
 Schwing!, High Speed Productions Inc. (1999–2001)
 Sci Fiction (2000–2005)
 Science (1979–1986)
 Science & Spirit (1989–2009)
 Science Digest (1937–1986)
 Science Fiction Age (1992–2000)
 Science Fiction Forum (1957–?)
 Science-Fiction Plus (1952–1953)
 Scooby-Doo Scooby Snacks, H&S Media Inc. ( –2001)
 Scope, Scholastic (19??–19??)
 Scribner's Magazine (1887–1939)
 Scribner's Monthly (1870–1881)
 Script (1929–1949)
 Scrye (1994-2009)
 Secret Agent X (1934–1939)
 See (1941–unknown)
 Sega Visions (1990–1995)
 Self (1979–2017; continues online)
 Senior Golfer, Time Inc. (1992–2001)
 Sesame Street Magazine, Sesame Workshop (1970–2008; continues online)
 Sesame Street Parents, Sesame Workshop (1981–2001)
 The Seven Arts (1916–1917)
 Shock Illustrated (1955–1956)
 Short Stories (1890–1959)
 Showmen's Trade Review (1933–1957)
 Shyflowers Garden Library, Shyflowers Enterprises Ltd. (2001)
 Sick (1960–1980)
 Silicon Alley Reporter, Rising Tide Studios (1998–2001)
 Simpsons Illustrated (1991–1993)
 Sinsemilla Tips (1980–1990)
 Situationist Antinational (1974)
 The Sky (1935–1941)
 Smart Partner, Ziff-Davis Media (1998–2001)
 The Smart Set (1900–1930)
 Soap Opera Magazine ( –1999)
 Soap Opera Update (1992–2002)
 Socialist Review (1970–2002)
 SoftSide, SoftSide Publications (1978–1984)
 Southern California New Homes, PRIMEDIA Haas Publishing Co. ( –2001)
 Southern Literary Journal and Monthly Magazine (1835–1837)
 Southern Literary Messenger (1834–1864)
 Space Science Fiction (1952–1953)
 Space Science Fiction Magazine (1957)
 Space Stories (1952–1953)
 Speak, Speak (1995–2001)
 Spicy Detective (1934–1947)
 SPORT (1946–2000)
 Sport Compact Car (1988–2009)
 Sporting News (1886–2012)
Sports Illustrated (1948–1949) published by Dell
 Sports Illustrated for Women (1999–2002)
 Sprint, Scholastic (197?–19??)
 Spy (1986–1998)
 STart (1986–1991)
 Startling Stories (1939–1955)
 Stirring Science Stories (1941–1942)
 Storm Track (1977–2002)
 Strange Stories (1939–1941)
 Strange Tales (1931–1933)
 Streaming Media, Penton Media ( –2001)
 Success, Success Holdings Co. LLC (1895–1999; 2000–2001)
 Sulfur (1981–2000)
 Sunshine (1924–1963)
 SuperMag (1976-198?)
 Super-Science Fiction (1956–1959)
 Super Science Stories (1940–1943; 1949–1951)
 Super Stock and Drag Illustrated (1960–1996)
 Swing, David Lauren (publisher), (ca.1995–ca.1999)
 Symra (1905–1914)
 The Syrian World (1926–1932)

T 

 T3, Imagine Media Inc. (2000–2001)
 Tales of Magic and Mystery (1927–1928)
 Talk (1999–2001)
 Teen, Hearst Corporation (1954–2009)
 Teen Girl Power, Starlog Group Inc. (1998–2001)
 Tele.com, CMP Media (1996–2001)
 Teen People, Time Inc (1998–2003)
 Ten Story Fantasy (1951)
 Terror Illustrated (1955–1956)
 TheaterWeek (1988–?)
 This (1971–1982)
 This Week (1935–1969)
 The Thrill Book (1919)
 Thrilling Adventures (1931–1943)
 To-Morrow (1903–1909)
 Today's Homeowner, Time Inc. (1928–2001)
 The Token and Atlantic Souvenir (1829–1842)
 Tomorrow (1942–1962)
 Tomorrow Speculative Fiction (1993–2000)
 Toosquare Magazine (2001–?)
 Top-Notch Magazine (1910–1937)
 Tops in Science Fiction (1953)
 Total Movie, Imagine Media Inc. (2000–2001)
 ToyFare (1997–2011)
 Transatlantic Review (1959–1977)
 Transition (1927–1938)
 Transsexual News Telegraph (1991–2002)
 Travel + Leisure Golf (1998–2009)
 Travel Holiday (1901–2003)
 Travelocity, AA Magazine Publications (2000–2001)
 Treasure Chest of Fun and Facts (1946–1972)
 Triumph (1966–1975)
 The Tropical Sun (1891–1930s)
 Trouser Press (1974–1984)
 Truckin' Magazine (1975–2020)
 True (1937–1975)
 True Tunes News (1989–1998)
 Trump (1957)
 Truth (1881–1905)
 Tryout (1914–1946)
 The Twilight Zone Magazine (1981–1989)
 Two Complete Science-Adventure Books (1950–1954)
 TWX (1944–1952)

U 

 U.S. Air Services (1919–1956)
 U.S. Lady (1955–?)
 U.S. News & World Report (1933–2010)
 Uncanny Stories (1941)
 Uncanny Tales (1939–1940)
 The United States Magazine and Democratic Review (1837–1859)
 University Business, (1998–2001)
 UNIX Review ( –2007)
 UnixWorld (1984–1995)
 Unknown (1939–1943)
 Upside (1989–2002)
 UpTime (1984–?)

V 

 Valiente, Valiente Ltd. (2000–2001)
 Valleykids Parent News, (1991–2001)
 Vanguard (1932–1939)
 Venture Science Fiction (1957–1958; 1969–1970)
 Verbatim (1974–?)
 Vice Versa (1947–1948)
 Video, Reese Communications Inc. (1978–1986)
 Video Game Review, H&S Media Inc. ( –2001)
 Video Games (1982–1984)
 VideoGames & Computer Entertainment (1988–1996)
 Video Review (1980–1991)
 Viva (1973–1980)
 Voice, Scholastic (1946–19??)
 The Voice of the Negro (1904–1907)

W 

 Walking, Reader's Digest (1986–2001)
 The Wargamer (1977–1990)
 Warman's Today's Collector, Krause Publications Inc. (1993–2001)
 The Wasp (1876–1941)
 Waymark, Angel Enterprises (1991)
 Weird Worlds, Scholastic (1979–1981)
 West Shore (1875–1891)
 Western Story Magazine (1919–1949)
 Wet (1976–1981)
 WHIRL Magazine, WHIRL Publishing (2001–2019)
 Whispers ( –ca.1984)
 Whitetail Business, Krause Publications Inc. (1997–2001)
 Whole Earth Review (1985–2003)
 Whole Earth Software Catalog and Review (1984–1985)
 Whole Living (2010–2013)
 Wigwag (1988–1991)
 Wild Cartoon Kingdom (1993–1994)
 Windows Magazine (1990–1999)
 Windows Sources (ca.1993–ca.2001)
 Wizard (1991–2011)
 Woman's Home Companion (1873–1957)
 Woman's Journal, IPC Media Inc. (1927–2001)
 WomenSports (1974–2000)
 Wonder Stories (1929–1955)
 Working Woman, Working Woman Network (1972–2001)
 Worlds Beyond (1950–1951)
 Worlds of Tomorrow (1963–1967; 1970–1971)
 The World's Work (1900–1932)
 Wormwood Review (1959–1999)
 Wow, Scholastic (1977–19??)
 WOW Magazine, H&S Media Inc./Kappa Publishing Group ( –2001)

X–Z 

 XRay Magazine (2000–2004)
 Yahoo! Internet Life ( –2002)
 Yank, the Army Weekly (1942–1945)
 Yellow Silk (1981–1996)
 YM (1932–2004)
 Young Wings (1929–1955)
 Young Woman's Journal (1897–1929)
 Your Garden, IPC Media Inc. (1992–2001)
 Your Life, IPC Media Inc. (2001)
 Your Money, Consumers Digest Media (1979–2001)
 The Youth's Companion (1827–1929)

See also 

 List of United States magazines
 Media of the United States

References

Magazines, United States
Lists of magazines published in the United States